Pauline "Polly" Gillespie is a New Zealand radio host, formerly on More FM. She co-hosted on The Polly and Grant Show Saturday mornings from 6-10am and the All-Day Breakfast show on Rova with her ex-husband, Grant Kereama.

Gillespie and Kereama hosted the ZM breakfast show from 1991 to 2014, making them the longest-serving breakfast duo in New Zealand. The show rated well in Wellington, and enjoyed success across New Zealand.

On 28 April 2014, Gillespie and her ex-husband launched a new show on The Hits, owned by NZME. They left The Hits in 2017, and moved to a Wellington weekday breakfast show on More FM that ended in June 2020.

Gillespie also wrote an agony aunt column for Woman's Day New Zealand until the magazine closed in April 2020. She has written an autobiography, titled The Misadventures of Polly Gillespie. She had previously outlined her family history in an opinion article published in The New Zealand Herald in 2016.

In November 2021, Gillespie was announced as part of the lineup for MediaWorks' brand new talk radio network, Today FM which launched in March 2022.

References

Living people
New Zealand radio presenters
New Zealand women radio presenters
New Zealand columnists
New Zealand women columnists
Advice columnists
Year of birth missing (living people)